This is a list of U.S. states and federal district by the number of households with more than $1 million in investable assets as of 2020 (data for the year 2019). The list is compiled annually by market research firm Phoenix Marketing International.

List

References 

millionaire households
United States, millionaire households